Statistics of the Primera División de México for the 1957–58 season.

Overview
Zamora (Segunda División Champion) were promoted to Primera División.

Atlético Morelia (second place in Segunda División) was also promoted to Primera División, to replace Puebla.

The season was contested by 14 teams, and Zacatepec won the championship.

Tampico was relegated to Segunda División.

Teams

League standings

Results

References
Mexico - List of final tables (RSSSF)

1957-58
Mex
1957–58 in Mexican football